Charles Bane may refer to:

 Charles A. Bane (1913–1998), American lawyer and civil rights activist
 Charles Bane, Jr. (born 1951), American poet